Ernő Földi is a male former international table tennis player from Hungary.

Table tennis career
He won a gold medal in the men's team event at the 1938 World Table Tennis Championships.

See also
 List of table tennis players
 List of World Table Tennis Championships medalists

References

Hungarian male table tennis players
World Table Tennis Championships medalists